Mansueto Bianchi (Lucca, 4 November 1949 − Rome, 3 August 2016) was an Italian Catholic bishop.

Biography
Born in Lucca, Tuscany, ordained to the priesthood in 1974, Bianchi served as Bishop of   Volterra, Italy from 2000 to 2006. He then served as Bishop of Pistoia from 2006 to 2014.

Notes

1949 births
2016 deaths
21st-century Italian Roman Catholic bishops
People from Lucca